Adoration: The Worship Album is the tenth studio album by the Christian pop rock band Newsboys, released in 2003. Unlike the band's previous albums, Adoration is a solely worship-oriented album (as the subtitle implies), deviating from the Newsboys' standard pop rock sound. This was the last Newsboys' album with the long-time guitarist Jody Davis, until his reunion with the group in 2009 for In the Hands of God.

Track listing

Music videos
"He Reigns"

Radio singles
"He Reigns"
"You Are My King (Amazing Love)"
"In Christ Alone"
"Adoration"

Personnel 
Newsboys
 Peter Furler – lead vocals, guitars, drums
 Phil Joel – bass guitar, guitars, vocals
 Duncan Phillips – drums, percussion
 Jody Davis – guitars, vocals
 Jeff Frankenstein – keyboards, programming

Additional vocals
 The Nathan Young Gospel Choir – choir (1, 7–10)
 Brandon Alexander
 Anthony Davis
 San Franklin-Stancil
 Yvonne Hodges
 Gale Mayes West
 Ann McCrary
 Wess Morgan
 Angela Primm
 Duawne Starling
 Chris Willis
 Nathan Young
 Suzanne Young
 Blair Children's Chorus – choir (5)
 Pam Schneller – choir director (5)

Production
 Peter Furler – producer 
 Steve Taylor – producer 
 Wes Campbell – executive producer 
 Lynn Nichols – executive producer 
 Dan Rudin – recording (1–6, 9, 10)
 Scott Kidd – recording assistant (1–6, 9, 10)
 Joe Baldridge – live recording (7, 8)
 Chuck Dennie – live recording assistant (7, 8)
 David Thoener – mixing at Sound Stage Studios, Nashville, Tennessee
 Jim Cooley – mix assistant 
 Bob Ludwig – mastering at Gateway Mastering, Portland, Maine
 Jan Cook – creative director 
 Benji Peck – art direction, design 
 Matthew Barnes – photography 
 First Company Management – management

Studios
 Bridge Sound Studios, Nashville, Tennessee – recording studio
 Emerald Sound Studios, Nashville, Tennessee – recording studio
 Sound Emporium, Nashville, Tennessee – recording studio

References

Newsboys albums
2003 albums
Sparrow Records albums